Harvey Birdman: Attorney at Law is a video game developed for the Wii, PlayStation 2 and PlayStation Portable by High Voltage Software, and released on January 8, 2008. It was published by Capcom, and is based on the Adult Swim animated series of the same name, with collaboration of the show's writers and voice actors. The gameplay heavily borrows from Capcom's Ace Attorney series.

Gameplay 

Gameplay is based on that of Capcom's Ace Attorney series, with players collecting evidence from crime scenes and cross-examining witnesses during trials, but with Harvey Birdman humor and aesthetic. Each of the game's five cases features a hidden Street Fighter character cameo; finding each one will unlock one of five bonus videos featuring bloopers from the game and spotlights of running gags from the show.

All of the show's voice cast reprise their roles for the video game, with the exception of Stephen Colbert; actors Stephen Stanton and Crispin Freeman respectively voice Phil Ken Sebben and Myron Reducto in his stead.

Plot 
In the game's first case, "The Burning Question", Peter Potamus is accused of burning down half of Harvey Birdman's house. In the second case, "The Cleaning Crew", Magilla Gorilla and Secret Squirrel are accused of robbing Harvey's office. In the third case, "From Glamour to Slamour", Yakky Doodle's latest name change lands him in jail when the Nailgun name makes the authorities think that he's the criminal of the same name.  Harvey comes to Yakky's defense, but winds up being jailed himself after it is discovered that his license has expired. In the fourth case, "Personal Piracy", Peanut is suspected of copying music controlled by the RIAA without permission. In the game's final case, "Two Birds, One Throne", Blue Falcon is put in charge during Phil's absence, and tricks Birdman into hiring prosecutors for his own "embezzling" trial.

Reception 

The game received "mixed" reviews on all platforms according to the review aggregation website Metacritic.

Maxim gave the game a score of three stars out of five and said that it was "actually funny, and unlike The Simpsons Game, it's actually fun to play. Game play is lifted straight out of Capcom's own Phoenix Wright series. [...] It's short enough that you can finish it in a couple of nights, but all the show's characters are in effect... along with their respective voice actors. Finally, the game's budget price (around $30) means there's no need to shout, 'I object!' when the game store clerk rings you up." 

However, The A.V. Club gave the PlayStation 2 version a C−, calling it "A decent rental, but not a wise investment." The New York Times gave the game an unfavorable review, stating that the game design was "just plain bad".

See also 
Ace Attorney

References

External links 
 

2008 video games
Adventure games
Capcom games
Criminal law video games
English-language-only video games
High Voltage Software games
North America-exclusive video games
PlayStation 2 games
PlayStation Portable games
Adult Swim games
Wii games
Harvey Birdman, Attorney at Law
Video games developed in the United States
Crossover video games
Visual novels